Jason Lea (born 25 June 1996) is an Australian racing cyclist, who most recently rode for UCI Continental team . In January 2019, he won the mountains classification at the 2019 Tour Down Under.

Major results
2018
 7th Overall Tour de Taiwan
2019
 1st  Mountains classification Tour Down Under

References

External links
 

1996 births
Living people
Australian male cyclists
Place of birth missing (living people)